Corrugated box design is the process of matching design factors for corrugated fiberboard boxes with the functional physical, processing and end-use requirements. Packaging engineers work to meet the performance requirements of a box while controlling total costs throughout the system.

In addition to the structural design discussed in this article, printed bar codes, labels, and graphic design are also vital.

Functions

Corrugated boxes are used frequently as shipping containers. Boxes need to contain the product from manufacturing through distribution to sale and sometimes end-use. Boxes provide some measure of product protection by themselves but often require inner components such as cushioning, bracing and blocking to help protect fragile contents. The shipping hazards depend largely upon the particular logistics system being employed. For example, boxes unitized into a unit load on a pallet do not encounter individual handling while boxes sorted and shipped through part of their distribution cycle as mixed loads or express carriers can receive severe shocks, kicks, and so forth.

Ordinary shipping containers require printing and labels to identify the contents, provide legal and regulatory information, and bar codes for routing. Boxes that are used for marketing, merchandising and point-of-sale often have high graphics to help communicate the contents. Some boxes are designed for the display of contents on the shelf known as "Retail Ready Packaging". Others are designed to help dispense the contents. Popular for their strength, durability, lightness, recyclability, and cost-effectiveness, corrugated boxes are used for the shipping of a variety of items. Due to the quality and safety of packaging items in corrugated boxes, they are used widely in the food industry. The boxes handle the pressure that comes with stacking, making them ideal for easy transporting.

Also, more elaborate and innovative box designs have emerged due to several reasons. Unboxing is one emerging trend that has challenged designers to create innovative new ways of opening boxes and lively product displays within those boxes. Another trend is the use of corrugated board for product displays. With the rigidity of corrugated board combined with the ability to print beautiful designs, corrugated board can be designed as a Point of Purchase display or "POP" display to showcase products in a fully branded display rather than the standard retail shelf. 

More than 95% of all products in the United States are shipped in corrugated boxes. Corrugated paperboard accounts for more than half of all the paper recycled in the US.

Stacking strength
One of the important functions of a corrugated box is to provide crush resistance (product protection) and adequate strength for stacking in warehouses.

A box can be designed by optimizing the grade of corrugated board, box design, flute direction, and inner supports. Support from the product also provides "load sharing" and can be an important factor. Box closures sometimes can have effects on box stacking strength.

If long-term storage of corrugated boxes in high humidity is expected, extra strength and moisture resistance is called for.

The method of loading boxes on pallets strongly affects stacking. Vertical columns provide the best box performance while interlocking patterns of boxes significantly reduce performance. The interaction of the boxes and pallets is also important.

Box compression testing is a means of evaluating boxes, stacks of boxes, and unit loads under controlled conditions. Field conditions of stacking and dynamic compression do not have the same degree of control. Compression strength can be estimated based on container construction, size, and use parameters: actual package testing is often conducted to verify these estimates.

Many packaging engineers find it beneficial to periodically audit warehouses and visit customers' package receiving operations. When field performance is observed or documented to have problems, a new cycle of design and testing may be justified.

Estimating compression 
Fiber Box Association has a method for estimating compression strength which includes the following factors:
 Time
 Moisture
 Palletizing type
 Pallet patterns
 Pallet type
 Handling

Process

Packaging engineers design corrugated boxes to meet the particular needs of the product being shipped, the hazards of the shipping environment, (shock, vibration, compression, moisture, etc.), and the needs of retailers and consumers

Engineers and designers start with the needs of the particular project: cost constraints, machinery capabilities, product characteristics, logistics needs, applicable regulations, consumer needs, etc. Often designs are made with Computer Aided Design programs connected to automated sample making tables. Several design and construction options might be considered.

Samples are often submitted to package testing based on ASTM or other standard test protocols such as the International Safe Transit Association. Structural design is matched with graphic design. For consumer based designs, marketing personnel sometimes use Focus groups or more quantitative means of assessing acceptance. Test markets are employed for major programs.

The process starts by making corrugated board on a corrugating line, a long series of linked machines which may be the size of an (American) football field. A finished piece of singlewall corrugated board is a single corrugated layer sandwiched between two liners.

Skilled workers prepare job tickets for each stack of box blanks and route the blanks to fabrication machines. Printing dies and patterns are prepared on large, flexible, rubber or tin sheets. They are loaded onto rollers and the box blanks are fed through it, where each is trimmed, printed, cut, scored, folded, and glued to form a box. Finished boxes are then stacked and sent to a banding machine to be wrapped and shipped.

Design

The most common box style is the Regular Slotted Container (RSC). All flaps are the same length from score to edge. Typically the major flaps meet in the middle and the minor flaps do not, unless the width is equal to the length. Box styles in Europe are typically specified by a 4-digit code provided by the European Federation of Corrugated Board Manufacturers (FEFCO); an RSC is coded 0201.

The manufacturer's joint is most often joined with adhesive but may also be taped or stitched. The box is shipped flat (knocked down) to the packager who sets up the box, fills it, and closes it for shipment. Box closure may be by tape, adhesive, staples, strapping, etc.

Many other styles of corrugated boxes and structures are available:
 FOL (Full Overlap): A Full Overlap Box is similar to an RSC except the major flaps fully overlap. Full-overlap flaps provide extra stacking strength and edge protection.
 HSC (Half Slotted Container): Half-Slotted Containers (HSC) are similar to an RSC, but with only one set of flaps. They are useful when an open-top container is desired. HSCs can be used to create a telescope box.
 A Full Telescope Box has two fully telescoping sections. The sections may be formed by staples, die-cut locks, adhesive, etc.
 A Partial Telescope Box has two sections. The top telescopes partially over the bottom. Commonly used for holding printing paper.
 A corrugated tray is often used for display purposes or used with a shrink wrap
 Corrugated corner pads can be used for product support and cushioning
 Special die-cut shapes have almost endless designs and uses.
 etc.

The size of a box can be measured for either internal (for product fit) or external (for handling machinery or palletizing) dimensions. Boxes are usually specified and ordered by the internal dimensions.

Retail display

Retailers often ask for merchandise to be delivered to them in shipping containers which allow the easy stocking of full caseloads. The goal is to put the case directly onto shelves and stocking locations without individually handling the unit packs or primary packages. Retailers often require products to come in shelf-ready packaging to reduce stocking costs and save labor expenses.
Several specialized box designs are available.

Individual mixed shipments

Many items are shipped individually (in part or entirely) by express carrier, mail, or other mixed logistics systems. The demands of multiple manual handlings, automated sortation, and uncontrolled stacking in trucks or air containers put severe stress on boxes, box closures, and the contents. Boxes designed for unit load handling and storage may not be suited to mixed logistics systems.

Less than truckload shipping puts more stress on corrugated shipping containers than shipment by uniform pallet loads in trucks or intermodal containers. Boxes sometimes need to be heavier construction to match the needs of the distribution system.

Government, military, and export
Many items being supplied to governments are handled very well: boxes are unitized, shipped on covered trucks or intermodal containers, and storage is in warehouses. Normal "domestic boxes" and commercial packaging are acceptable.

Military materiel, field supplies, and humanitarian aid often encounter severe handling and uncontrolled storage. Special box specifications for government shipments are often applicable. Weather-resistant fiberboards, box construction, box closure, and unitizing are needed.

Export
Many international shipments are handled very well: boxes are unitized, shipped on covered trucks or intermodal containers, and storage is in warehouses. Normal "domestic boxes" are commonly used.

Break bulk cargo needs to be water-resistant and heavy-duty. Even shipments initially sent via intermodal freight transport  may have subsequent logistics operations that are extreme and uncontrolled. The specific conditions in the destination port and the country of use need to be considered for the design of export boxes.

Dangerous and hazardous goods

Shipment of dangerous goods or hazardous materials are highly regulated. Based on the UN Recommendations on the Transport of Dangerous Goods model regulations, each country has coordinated design and performance requirements for shipment.  For example, in the US, the Department of Transportation has jurisdiction and published requirements in Title 49 of the Code of Federal Regulations. Corrugated boxes are described in 4G requirements.  Performance (severe drop test, etc.) needs to be certified for the box and contents.

Some carriers have additional requirements.

Box closure
The means of closing a box is an important aspect of design. It is affected by the types of equipment available to production lines, the measured laboratory performance, the field performance, and the ability of end-users to easily and safely open the box.

Box closures include:
 Adhesive,  water-based or hot-melt adhesive - Adhesives are applied manually or by machine. Starch-based adhesives are the choice of a corrugator as it is economic. Starch works as a medium for molds, lichens, and fungus, so to prevent it, antifungals are added in it before use.
 Staples - staples are used to attach the box flaps.  Small (nominally  inch crown) staples can be applied to a box with a post stapler. Wider crown (nominally  inch) staples can be applied with a blind clincher
 Box sealing tape, pressure-sensitive-tapes are available in various widths i.e. 36, 48, and 72 mm widths and several thicknesses. BOPP and PET are used as a backing. Taping is done either manually or by semi-automatic Case sealer.
 Filament tape, reinforced pressure-sensitive tape used to close boxes.
 Gummed paper tape -  consists of a heavy paper in which adhesive is activated by water and bonds the tape to the box.
 Reinforced water activated gummed tape.  Two plies of paper with reinforcing filaments embedded between them.
 Strapping - straps are generally used for unitizing, made up of plastic (PP, PE, PET, PVC), metal (SS steel) etc. and are available in various widths.
 Shrink wrap - it is a thin film of LLDPE, LDPE, etc. which shrinks with the application of heat resulting in wrapping a box from all sides. Shrink wrapping is generally more expensive as it needs a hot tunnel and requires more material than the alternatives. However, the packed box will be better protected from the environment as the wrap works as a barrier.

References

Books, general references
"Fibre Box Handbook", Fibre Box Association, Chicago IL
 
 European Corrugated Board Industry
 Good Manufacturing Practices for Corrugated and Solid Board Packaging
 Soroka, W, "Fundamentals of Packaging Technology", IoPP, 2002, 
 "Guide for Packaging for Small Parcel Shipments", 2005, IoPP
 Yam, K. L., "Encyclopedia of Packaging Technology", John Wiley & Sons, 2009,

ASTM standards
 D642 Test Method for Determining Compressive Resistance of Shipping Containers, Components, and Unit Loads.
 D1974 Standard Practice for Methods of Closing, Sealing and Reinforcing Fiberboard Boxes
 D4577 Test Method for Compression Resistance of a Container Under Constant Load
 D5118 Standard Practice for Fabrication of Fiberboard Shipping Boxes
 D5168 Standard Practice for Fabrication and Closure of Triple-Wall Corrugated Fiberboard Containers
 D5639 Standard Practice for Selection of Corrugated Fiberboard Materials and Box Construction Based on Performance Requirements
 D6804 Standard Guide for Hand Hole Design in Corrugated Boxes

Containers
Corrugation
Industrial design
Shipping containers